Dobieszyn  is a village in the administrative district of Gmina Stromiec, within Białobrzegi County, Masovian Voivodeship, in east-central Poland.

The village has a population of 370.

References

Dobieszyn